Fengfu is a railway station of Taiwan Railways Administration Taichung line located in Houlong Township, Miaoli County, Taiwan. Transfers to THSR Miaoli Station can be made at this station.

History
25 May 1903: The station opened for service.
10 September 2016: The station was moved approx. 400 meters north from its original location to allow transfers to THSR Miaoli Station.

Around the station
 Hakka Round House
 THSR Miaoli Station

See also
 List of railway stations in Taiwan

References

1903 establishments in Taiwan
Railway stations in Miaoli County
Railway stations opened in 1903
Railway stations served by Taiwan Railways Administration